The Legazpi Grand Central Terminal is a bus terminus in Legazpi, Albay, Philippines.

Facilities 

The terminal is in the Legazpi Port District. It covers an area of about 3.9 hectares. The terminal is operated through a public–private partnership between the city government and LKY Group, a local land developer. The terminal can accommodate to over 30 buses, and also has restaurants and shops. The development of the terminal along with the adjacent mall cost around ₱300 million (US$6 million).

Connections 
The terminal is connected with a jeepney and UV Express terminal called the LKY Metro Transport and Lifestyle Hub. It serves passengers from the terminal to small towns near Legazpi City, including a jeep that will serve as a direct service to the Mayon Volcano. Like the Legazpi Grand Central Terminal, it also houses restaurants and shops.

Nearby landmarks
The terminal is near the Port of Legazpi, Pacific Mall, Yashano Mall, SM City Legazpi and the Ibalong Centrum for Recreation.

Direct routes
The terminal has direct access to Manila, as well as nearer Sorsogon City, Iriga and Naga City.

Ticketing offices 

The terminal houses ticketing offices for its tenant bus companies. Those bus companies who do not have ticketing offices inside the terminal may sell tickets inside the bus.

References 

Transportation in Albay
Buildings and structures in Legazpi, Albay
Bus stations in the Philippines